The 1872 United States presidential election in Louisiana took place on November 5, 1872, as part of the 1872 United States presidential election. Voters chose eight representatives, or electors to the Electoral College, who voted for president and vice president.

Louisiana voted for the Republican candidate, Ulysses S. Grant, over Liberal Republican candidate Horace Greeley. Grant won Louisiana by a margin of 11.38%. However, due to the turbulent conditions of Reconstruction, along with various irregularities and allegations of electoral fraud,  Congress rejected Louisiana's eight electoral votes. Neighboring Arkansas's electoral votes were also rejected.

Results

See also
 United States presidential elections in Louisiana

References

Louisiana
1872
1872 Louisiana elections